Hansford Herndon Rowe Jr. (May 12, 1924 – September 5, 2017) was an American film, stage and television actor.

Early life and education
Rowe was born in Richmond, Virginia, the son of Virginia Isabel (née Willis) and Hansford Herndon Rowe, who was a veterinarian. He was one of five siblings.

Rowe was a graduate of John Marshall High School. He served in the US Navy during World War II in the South Pacific on a minesweeper warship as a radio controller. He subsequently graduated with a degree in Theater Arts from University of Richmond.

Career
His first television role was in the 1967 TV movie The Thanksgiving Visitor. In 1968, he had a non-speaking role as a judge in three episodes of the cult series Dark Shadows. In 1969, he played a judge on the long-running CBS daytime drama The Guiding Light.

Rowe played in the 1983 NBC miniseries V as Arthur Dupres, the stepfather of resistance leader Mike Donovan. He reprised his role in the 1984 sequel V: The Final Battle. Rowe made guest appearances on TV shows, including Love, Sidney, L.A. Law, The Greatest American Hero, Six Feet Under, Night Court and Will & Grace. He played President Harry S. Truman in Dark Skies.

Rowe's film roles include Gordon's War (1973), Missing (1982), Baby Boom (1987), and Dry Cycle (2003).

In 1980, Rowe appeared on Broadway in Nuts, for which he was nominated for the Drama Desk Award for Outstanding Featured Actor in a Play.

Personal life
Rowe was married and had two sons and another by marriage.

On September 5, 2017, Rowe died in a car accident in Newhall, California. He was 93 years old. He donated his body for scientific study.

Filmography
Gordon's War (1973) - Dog Salesman
Three Days of the Condor (1975) - Jennings
Simon (1980) - Priest Babcock Beastly
Missing (1982) - Senator
Malibu (1983, TV Movie) - Dr. Ferraro
V (1983, TV Mini-Series) - Arthur Dupres
The Osterman Weekend (1983) - General Keever
V: The Final Battle (1984, TV Mini-Series) - Arthur Dupres
Dream West (1986, TV Mini-Series) - John Floyd
Baby Boom (1987) - Sam Potts
The First Power (1990) - Father Brian
The Bonfire of the Vanities (1990) - Leon Bavardage
Sandino (1991) - Ambassador Hanna
Dante's Peak (1997) - Warren Cluster
Spider-Man (1997, TV Series) - Thunderer/Jerry Carstairs
You Lucky Dog (1998, TV Movie) - Mr. Windsor
Dry Cycle (2003) - Ed
Curb Your Enthusiasm (2005, TV Series) - Mr. Cone 
The Office (2007, TV Series) - Elbert Lapin
The Perfect Family (2011) - Bishop Donnelly

References

External links

1924 births
2017 deaths
American male film actors
American male stage actors
American male television actors
Male actors from Richmond, Virginia
Road incident deaths in California
United States Navy personnel of World War II
United States Navy sailors